Antonia's Line (Original title: Antonia) is a 1995 Dutch feminist film written and directed by Marleen Gorris. The film, described as a "feminist fairy tale", tells the story of the independent Antonia (Willeke van Ammelrooy) who, after returning to the anonymous Dutch village of her birth, establishes and nurtures a close-knit matriarchal community. The film covers a breadth of topics, with themes ranging from death and religion to sex, intimacy, lesbianism, friendship and love.

Antonia's Line was made after challenges in finding locations and funding in the 1980s and 1990s. It enjoyed critical success and several awards, including the Academy Award for Best Foreign Language Film at the 68th Academy Awards.

Plot
Following World War II, the widow Antonia and her daughter Danielle arrive at Antonia's home town where her mother is dying. She reunites with her old friend Crooked Finger, a depressed intellectual who refuses to leave his house. She also begins attracting a following, including Deedee, a mentally handicapped girl, after she is raped by her brother Pitte, and Loony Lips, a simple-minded man who falls in love with Deedee. A pariah, Pitte flees the village. Antonia turns down an offer of marriage from Farmer Bas, but develops a lasting romance with him.

Danielle, who has a vivid imagination, becomes an artist and expresses interest in raising a child, while rejecting the idea of having a husband. Antonia and Danielle visit the city to find a man to impregnate Danielle, resulting in the birth of Therèse, a child prodigy. Danielle falls in love with Therèse's tutor, Lara, and they remain together in a lesbian relationship. Therèse develops an understanding and kinship with Crooked Finger beyond what Danielle could be capable of.

Years later, Pitte returns to town to collect his inheritance and rapes Therèse. Antonia places a curse on him, after which he is beaten by men of the village and drowned by his brother. Therèse is unable to find her intellectual match but eventually has a relationship with a childhood friend, resulting in her pregnancy. She decides to keep the baby and gives birth to Sarah, the film's narrator, who has a fascination with death. Sarah observes many of her elders die off, including Crooked Finger who commits suicide, and Loony Lips who suffers a tractor accident on the farm. Antonia later dies of old age, surrounded by family and friends.

Cast

Production

Director and screenwriter Marleen Gorris envisioned the story as distinct from her previous work, such as A Question of Silence (1982), which she referred to as "indictments against society". She referred to Antonia as "a celebration of life", incorporating fairy tale elements and cruel details. Gorris finished the screenplay in 1988. However, making the film took three attempts, with challenges stemming from putting together a large cast and finding a village that could be portrayed as realistic for a 50-year period. It was eventually filmed in Belgium.

Another major challenge was finding investors. Funding ultimately came from the Netherlands, Belgium and the UK. With the help of producer Hans de Weers, Gorris found investors and also worked with British producer Judy Counihan of Red Hot Organization. The budget was £1.5 million. Filming finished in November 1994.

Reception

Box office
In the Netherlands, the film grossed $272,294. In the United States, Antonia's Line opened in 99 theatres, and made $1.8 million in its first 10 days. After 164 days, it crossed the $4 million mark. According to Box Office Mojo, the film completed its run grossing $4,228,275 in North America and $21,046 in South Korea, for a worldwide total of $4,249,321. In the European Union, it had 1,660,901 ticket sales.

Critical reception

According to Dutch director Mike van Diem, the film received more positive reviews in the United States than in its native Netherlands, saying "We thought it was a good film, but nobody thought it was that good". Dutch writer Hans Kroon suggested the U.S. reception was out of a need for escapism. Roger Ebert gave the film four stars, saying the film showed "the everyday realities of rural life, a cheerful feminism, a lot of easygoing sex and a gallery of unforgettable characters". Emanuel Levy, writing for The Advocate, wrote "It's easy to see why" the film was winning awards in festivals, calling it "an enchanting fairy tale that maintains a consistently warm, lighthearted feel", and Willeke van Ammelrooy wonderful. Janet Maslin of The New York Times called it "a work of magical feminism". Alan A. Stone of the Boston Review called it an "astonishingly beautiful film" representing "a truce in the gender war". Kevin Thomas of the Los Angeles Times said Antonia's Line is "Beautiful, tender, hearty and poetic", and Van Ammelrooy is warm.  Conversely, Edward Guthmann of the San Francisco Chronicle called the film "an odd mix of schmaltz and anti-male orneriness" and the character of Antonia a "sour pickle". Jonathan Rosenbaum of the Chicago Reader called it "humorless" "feminist rage".

In his 2002 Movie & Video Guide, Leonard Maltin called it "a treat from start to finish".  On Rotten Tomatoes, the film has an approval rating of 67%, based on 48 reviews.

Women's studies professor Linda López McAlister commented that "It seems to me that Gorris's accomplishment in this film is to have created a sense of place and characters full of life, full of quirks and idiosyncrasies and peccadillos, full of love, and rage, and desire". Anneke Smelik analyzed the film, writing "It is Oedipal in the sense that it is about a family, but instead of featuring the triangle of father, mother and child, the film establishes a line of mothers and daughters." She goes on to write, "Female desire is represented in all of its diverse manifestations: Antonia's wish for independence, Danielle's quest for artistic creativity, Therèse's pursuit of knowledge, and Sarah's curiosity about life in general".

Accolades
Antonia's Line won the 1996 Academy Award for Best Foreign Language Film, the Toronto International Film Festival People's Choice award, and two Nederlands Film Festival Golden Calf awards. Gorris also won for Best Director at the Hamptons International Film Festival and Best Screenplay at the Chicago International Film Festival.

See also
 List of submissions to the 68th Academy Awards for Best Foreign Language Film
 List of Dutch submissions for the Academy Award for Best Foreign Language Film

References

Further reading
 
 
 
 
 
  (via issuu)

External links
 
 
 
  Antonia at Lumiere
 
 

1995 films
1995 comedy-drama films
1990s feminist films
1990s Dutch-language films
Dutch LGBT-related films
Lesbian-related films
Films set in the Netherlands
Films shot in Belgium
Films directed by Marleen Gorris
Best Foreign Language Film Academy Award winners
Dutch comedy-drama films
LGBT-related comedy-drama films
1995 LGBT-related films
Toronto International Film Festival People's Choice Award winners